Alathur  is a village in the Mannargudi taluk of Tiruvarur district in Tamil Nadu, India.

Demographics 

As per the 2001 census, Alathur had a population of 1,626 with 841 males and 785 females. The sex ratio was 933. The literacy rate was 67.39.

References 

 

Villages in Tiruvarur district